The 8th Wisconsin Infantry Regiment was an infantry regiment that served in the Union Army during the American Civil War. The 8th Wisconsin's mascot was Old Abe, a bald eagle that accompanied the regiment into battle.

Service
The 8th Wisconsin was raised at Madison, Wisconsin, and mustered into Federal service September 13, 1861.

The regiment was mustered out on September 5, 1865, at Demopolis, Alabama.

Total enlistments and casualties
The 8th Wisconsin initially mustered 870 men and later recruited an additional 333 men, for a total of 1,203 men.
The regiment lost 2 officers and 53 enlisted men killed in action or who later died of their wounds, plus another 2 officers and 219 enlisted men who died of disease, for a total of 280 fatalities.

Commanders
 Colonel Robert C. Murphy
 Colonel George W. Robbins
 Colonel John W. Jefferson
 Colonel William B. Britton

Battles
The 8th Wisconsin Infantry along with their mascot Old Abe The War Eagle attended numerous battles and lesser engagements during the war:
Fredericktown, Missouri  - 21 October 1861
New Madrid and *Island #10 - March & April 1862 Union General John Pope captures Point Pleasant, Missouri, and provokes Confederates to evacuate New Madrid. The Confederates abandon arms and provisions, valued at one million dollars, during their escape across the Mississippi River to the eastern bank and to Island No. 10.
Point Pleasant, Missouri - 20 March 1862
Farmington, Mississippi. - 9 May 1862
Corinth, Mississippi. - 28 May 1862
Iuka, Mississippi. - 12 September 1862
Burnsville, Mississippi. - 13 September 1862
Iuka, Mississippi. - 16–18 September 1862
Corinth, Mississippi. - 3–4 October 1862
Tallahatchie, Mississippi. - 2 December 1862
Mississippi Springs, Mississippi. - 13 May 1863
Jackson, Mississippi. - 14 May 1863
Assault on Vicksburg, Mississippi. - 22 May 1863
Mechanicsburg, Mississippi. - 4 June 1863
Richmond, Louisiana. - 15 June 1863
Vicksburg, Mississippi. - 24 June 1863
Surrender of Vicksburg- 4 July 1863
Brownsville, Mississippi. - 14 October 1863
Meridian campaign, Mississippi. - February 3 - March 6, 1864
Fort Scurry, Louisiana. - 13 March 1864
Fort De Russey, Louisiana. - 15 March 1864
Henderson's Hill, Louisiana. - 21 March 1864
Grand Ecore, Louisiana. - 2 April 1864
Pleasant Hill, Louisiana. - 8–9 April 1864
Natchitoches, Louisiana. - 20 April 1864
Kane River, Louisiana. - 22 April 1864
Clouterville and Crane Hill, Louisiana. - 23 April 1864
Bayou Rapids, Louisiana. - 2 May 1864
Bayou La Monre, Louisiana. - 3 May 1864
Bayou Roberts, Louisiana. - 4–6 May 1864
Moore's Plantation, Louisiana. - 8–12 May 1864
Mansura, Louisiana. - 16 May 1864
Battle of Maysville, Louisiana. - 17 May 1864
Calhoun's Plantation, Louisiana. - 18 May 1864
Bayou De Glaise, Louisiana. - 18 May 1864
Lake Chicot, Arkansas. - 6 June 1864
Hurricane Creek, Mississippi. - 13 August 1864
Pursuit of Price, Jackass Cavalry September - October 1864
Nashville, Tennessee. - 15–16 December 1864
The Mobile Campaign March - April 1865

Notable members
 Pvt Thomas J. Bowles – member of the Wisconsin State Assembly
 Sgt Maj Augustus G. Weissert – 21st Commander-in-Chief of the Grand Army of the Republic, 1892–1893
 Maj William P. Lyon – brevet Brigadier General, Speaker of the Wisconsin State Assembly, Chief Justice of the Wisconsin Supreme Court
 Pvt George Washington Glover Jr., (1844-1915); the only son of Mary Baker Eddy
 Col John Wayles Jefferson, (1835-1892); presumed grandson of Thomas Jefferson and Sally Hemings

See also

 List of Wisconsin Civil War units
 Wisconsin in the American Civil War

References

Further reading
Armitage, Ambrose, and Alden R. Carter. Brother to the Eagle: The Civil War Journal of Sgt. Ambrose Armitage, 8th Wisconsin Volunteer Infantry. [Bangor, ME]: Booklocker.com, Inc, 2006.   
Barrett, J. O. History of "Old Abe," The Live War Eagle of the Eighth Regiment Wisconsin Volunteers. Chicago: O.L. Sewell, 1865. 
Driggs, George W. Opening of the Mississippi: Or Two Years' Campaigning in the South-West. A Record of the Campaigns, Sieges, Actions and Marches in Which the 8th Wisconsin Volunteers Have Participated. Madison, Wis: W.J. Park & Co., printers, 1864. 
Shumway, Francis, Ronald William Harris, and Rhonda Harris. Francis #3138: The Civil War Letters of Francis (Frank) Shumway, Company F, Eighth Regiment, Wisconsin Volunteers, 1861–1862. La Crosse, WI : R.W. Harris, 1995. 
Williams, J. M. The Eagle Regiment, 8th Wis. Inf'ty. Vols. A Sketch of Its Marches, Battles and Campaigns, from 1861 to 1865 ; with a Complete Regimental and Company Roster, and a Few Portraits and Sketches of Its Officers and Commanders. Belleville, Wis: Recorder Print, 1890.

External links
The Civil War Archive

8th Wisconsin

Military units and formations established in 1861
Military units and formations disestablished in 1865
Units and formations of the Union Army from Wisconsin
1861 establishments in Wisconsin